The Man Who Died Twice may refer to:

 The Man Who Died Twice (film), by Joseph Kane
 The Man Who Died Twice (novel), by Richard Osman